August Bösch was a German fishing trawler that was requisitioned by the Kriegsmarine in the Second World War for use as a Vorpostenboot, serving as V 409 August Bösch. She was bombed and sunk off the coast of Vendée, France in August 1944.

Description
The engine was made by H. C. Stülcken Sohn, Hamburg, Germany. It was rated at 136nhp.

History
August Bösch was built in 1934 as yard number 689 by H. C. Stülcken Sohn, Hamburg, for C. C. H. Bösch, Bremerhaven, Germany. She was launched on 8 June and competed on 10 August. The Code Letters DQPZ were allocated, as was the  fishing boat registration BX 246. 

On 25 September 1939, August Bösch was requistioned by the Kriegsmarine for use as a vorpostenboot. She was commissioned into 4 Vorpostenflotille as V 409 August Bösch. On 20 August 1944, she was bombed and sunk in the Bay of Biscay off Les Sables-d'Olonne, Vendée, France by Allied aircraft.  The minesweeper M 4214 Jean Marthe was also sunk in the attack.

References

Bibliography

1934 ships
Ships built in Hamburg
Fishing vessels of Germany
Steamships of Germany
Auxiliary ships of the Kriegsmarine
Maritime incidents in August 1944
World War II shipwrecks in the Atlantic Ocean
Shipwrecks in the Bay of Biscay